Pareiorhina rosai is a species of catfish in the family Loricariidae. It is native to South America, where it occurs in the São Francisco River basin in the state of Minas Gerais in Brazil. The species reaches at least 4.7 cm (1.9 inches) in standard length. It was described in 2016 by Gabriel S. C. Silva (of São Paulo State University), Fábio F. Roxo (also of São Paulo State University), and Osvaldo Takeshi Oyakawa (of the University of São Paulo) on the basis of its distinctive morphology. FishBase does not yet list this species.

References 

Loricariidae
Fish of the São Francisco River basin
Fish described in 2016
Catfish of South America